is a district consisting of Okushiri Island, administered as part of Hiyama Subprefecture, Hokkaido, Japan.

As of 2004, the district has an estimated population of 3,708 and a density of 25.93 persons per km2. The total area is 142.98 km2.

Towns and villages
Okushiri

Districts in Hokkaido